

The yeii or yei are spirit deities of the Navajo people. The most benevolent of such beings are the Diyin Diné'e or Holy People who are associated with the forces of nature.

Yei bichei (Yébîchai), or "maternal grandfather of the yei", is another name of Talking God who often speaks on behalf of the other Holy People. (He, along with Growling God, Black God, and Water Sprinkler, were the first four Holy People encountered by the Navajo.)  He is invoked (along with eight other male yei) in the "Night Chant" or "Nightway" (Navajo:  or Kléjê Hatál), sometimes simply called "Yei bichei," a nine-night ceremony in which masked dancers personify the gods.

A rainbow yei, sometimes considered an aspect of the rain-god Water Sprinkler, is drawn around every sandpainting; his body curls around the south, west, and north sides to protect the painting from outside influences, and to protect the user from the power of the god depicted in the painting. He does not need to cover the east, because no evil can come from the east in Navajo thought.

See also
Yōkai
Vættir

References

Further reading
Bahti, Mark with Joe, Eugene Baatsoslanii. A Guide to Navajo Sandpaintings. Tucson, Ariz.: Rio Nuevo Publishers, c2000. 
Levy, Jerrold E. In the beginning: the Navajo genesis. Berkeley: University of California Press, c1998. (Note: see P58-59)

External links
Carey Jr., Harold (September 28, 2012). "Yei Bi Chei (Yébîchai) Night Chant-First Day", NavajoPeople.org.

Deities of the indigenous peoples of North America
Navajo mythology